The Sunday Fairs Act 1448 (27 Hen 6 c 5) was an Act of the Parliament of England.

The words from "Provided always that" to the end were repealed by section 1 of, and Schedule 1 to, the Statute Law Revision Act 1948.

The whole Chapter was repealed by section 1 of, and Part IV of the Schedule to, the Statute Law (Repeals) Act 1969.

The repeal of the Sunday Fairs Act 1448 by the Statute Law (Repeals) Act 1969 does not have the effect of requiring any market or fair to be held on a Sunday, Good Friday, Ascension Day, Corpus Christi Day, the Feast of the Assumption of Our Blessed Lady or All Saints' Day; and a market or fair may continue to be held on any day on which it might lawfully have been held if the Sunday Fairs Act 1448 had not been repealed.

References
Halsbury's Statutes,

Acts of the Parliament of England
1440s in law
1448 in England